Jack Rio may refer to:

 Jack Del Rio (born 1963), American football coach
 Jack Rio (film), a 2008 film